Mohsen Amiryousefi (born 1972) is an Iranian director and screenwriter. A graduate in mathematics from Isfahan University, he completed his first short film in 1997 based on a story by Franz Kafka, after writing several screenplays for both screen and stage.

Mohsen Amiryoussefi first came to prominence with his 2004 black comedy “Bitter Dream,” about a funeral director. He took home the Camera d’Or at that year’s Cannes Film Festival 2004 as well as generous critical acclaim. Amiryoussefi belongs to the third generation of "Iranian New Wave".

Awards
He has received international awards for his critically acclaimed movies Khab- talkh and Atashkar.

Filmography
Khab-e talkh or Bitter Dream (2004)
Atashkar or Fire Keeper (2009) 
Ashghal haye Doost Dashtani or Lovely Trashes (2012)

See also
Iranian New Wave
Cinema of Iran

Notes

External links
 

Iranian film directors
1972 births
Living people